United Nations Security Council Resolution 3, adopted on April 4, 1946, acknowledged that the Soviet troops in Iran could not be removed in time to meet their deadline under the Tri-Partite Treaty but requested the Soviet Union remove them as fast as possible and that no member state in any way retard this process. If any developments threaten the withdrawal of troops, the Security Council requested to be informed.

The resolution was adopted by 9 votes, with Australia present and not voting, and the USSR absent.

See also
 Anglo-Soviet invasion of Iran
 List of United Nations Security Council Resolutions 1 to 100 (1946–1953)

References
 Text of the Resolution at undocs.org

External links
 

 0003
1946 in Iran
1946 in the Soviet Union
Iran–Soviet Union relations
Iran–Soviet Union border
 0003
 0003
April 1946 events